= Zhuhai Radio and Television Station =

Media company in Guangdong, China

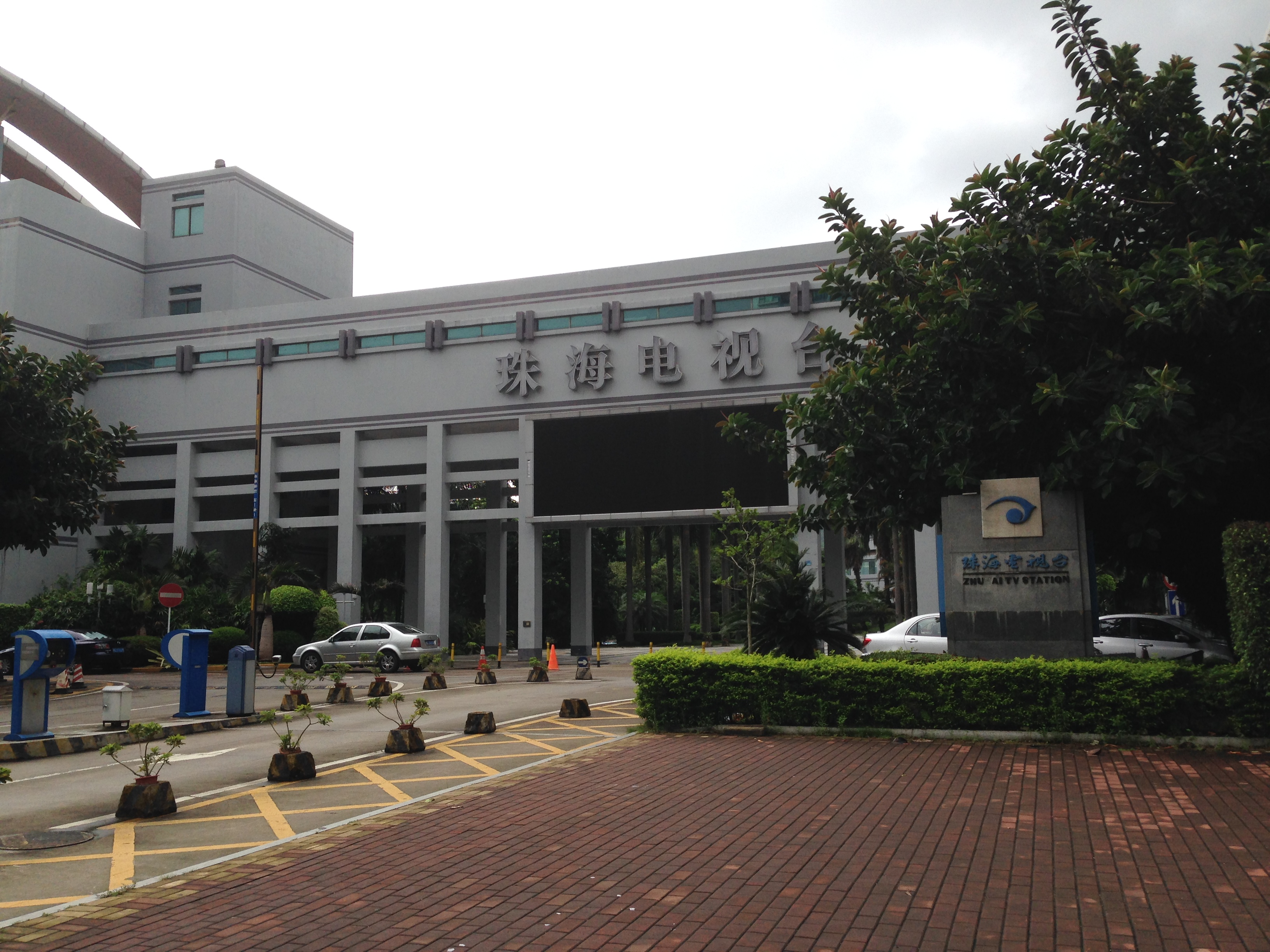
- Main entrance
- Type: Public
- Country: China
- First air date: 1 July 1985 (radio); 1 February 1985 (television)
- Headquarters: Zhuhai
- Owner: Propaganda Committee of the Zhuhai Municipal Committee of the CCP
- Established: April 2005（挂牌成立）
- Official website: www.hizh.cn

The Zhuhai Radio and Television Station (珠海广播电视台) and its subsidiary, the Zhuhai Radio and Television Media Group (珠海廣播影視傳媒集團), is a media company based in Zhuhai, Guangdong Province.

== History ==
The predecessor to the current corporation were Zhuhai Television and the Zhuhai People's Radio Station. The television station was established on 1 February 1985 and started broadcasting an experimental television service on 7 February 1986. On 28 May 1999, the Zhuhai Television Station merged with Zhuhai Cable TV and became a public institution at department level. Local radio broadcasts began on 1 July 1985.

In April 2005, Zhuhai Television, Zhuhai People's Radio Station, Zhuhai Radio and Television Transmitter Station and Zhuhai Radio and Television Monitoring Center were merged to form the Zhuhai Radio and Television Station.

On 8 September 2017, the Zhuhai Radio and Television Media Group was founded using the basis of the Zhuhai Radio and Television Station.

On 28 April 2019, the Zhuhai Newspaper Group merged with the Zhuhai Radio and Television Media Group to form the Zhuhai Media Group, which has the ability to control all key media services (radio, television, press).

== Services ==
=== Television ===
TV channels	Launch date
News and General Channel (新闻综合频道)	Launch: 7 February 1986; HD launch: 23 April 2012

==== Former channels ====
- Economic and Life Channel: Originally part of Zhuhai Cable Television, it was incorporated into Zhuhai Television in 1999. Over time, it was renamed Zhuhai Television Life Channel, later, Zhuhai Radio and Television Public Channel. It was renamed Economic and Life Channel on 29 May 2023 and closed on 1 August 2024.
- Pearl River Delta Channel: Launched on 28 May 2014, it broadcast to seven cities in the Pearl River Delta. It is unknown when did the channel shut down.

=== Radio stations ===
Name	Frequency	Launch date	Former name	Notes
News and General Service（先锋951）	FM 95.1 MHz	1 July 1985		
Business and Environment Radio（交通875）	FM 87.5 MHz	1 January 2000	Green FM	
Voice of Hengqin（活力915）	FM 91.5 MHz; AM 612 kHz	1 January 2014; 1 January 2023 (renamed Voice of Hengqin)	Voice of a Thousand Islands	
